William Houstoun, also spelled Houston (– March 17, 1813), was a Founding Father of the United States, statesman, lawyer, planter, and slave owner.  He served the Province of Georgia as a delegate to the Continental Congress and later the State of Georgia to the United States Constitutional Convention in 1787.

Early life
William Houstoun was the son of Sir Patrick Houstoun, a member of the council under the royal government of Georgia. He was born in 1755 in Savannah, Georgia. Houstoun received a liberal education, which included legal training at Inner Temple in London.

Role in the Continental Congress
The American Revolution cut short his training, and Houstoun returned home to Georgia. For many years members of Houstoun's family had been high officials in the colony. With the onset of war, many remained loyal to the crown, but William, a zealous advocate of colonists' rights, was among the first to counsel resistance to British aggression.

Houstoun represented Georgia in the Continental Congress from 1783 through 1786.

He was chosen as one of Georgia's agents to settle a boundary dispute with South Carolina in 1785 and was one of the original trustees of the University of Georgia at Athens.

Delegate to the Georgia Convention
When the Constitutional Convention convened in 1787, Houstoun presented his credentials as one of Georgia's delegates. He stayed for only a short time, from June 1 until about July 23, but he was present during the debate on the representation question. Houstoun split Georgia's vote on equal representation in the Senate, voting "nay" against Abraham Baldwin's "aye." His fellow Georgia delegate William Pierce wrote of him: "As to his legal or political knowledge, he has very little to boast of. Nature seems to have done more for his corporeal than mental powers. His Person is striking, but his mind very little improved with useful or elegant knowledge."

Houstoun also reportedly threatened to kill a reverend living in Rhode Island for making a critical remark about the South. Biographer Edith Duncan Johnston finds room for flattery despite this, writing: “Loyal to his native state and section, he was quick to avenge any insinuation that reflected against either.”

Pierce was also flexible in his assessment, or simply looking towards posterity, concluding Houstoun had “good and honorable principles” in his notes from the 1850s.

Later life
Houstoun married Mary Bayard, the daughter of Nicholas Bayard (baptized 1736), a member of the Bayard family, prominent in New York City, from which Bayard Street takes its name.  Houston Street, originally part of his father-in-law's estate in the New York City Borough of Manhattan was named for Houstoun, using an alternate spelling. Houston Street in Savannah is also named for him.

Houstoun died in Savannah on March 17, 1813, and was interred in St. Paul's Chapel in New York City.

References

1755 births
1813 deaths
People of Georgia (British colony)
Politicians from Savannah, Georgia
American planters
Continental Congressmen from Georgia (U.S. state)
18th-century American politicians
American slave owners
Drafting of the United States Constitution
Burials at St. Paul's Chapel
Founding Fathers of the United States